Alberta Provincial Highway No. 16X, commonly referred to as Highway 16X, is the designation of one former and three proposed routes off Highway 16 (Yellowhead Highway) in Alberta, Canada. Right of way is set aside around Hinton, Edson, and Lloydminster that is presently designated as Highway 16X.

History 
In the 1970s, Highway 16 was a four-lane, divided highway that passed along the northern edge of Stony Plain, through Spruce Grove, and passed through Edmonton along Stony Plain Road, Mayfield Road, 111 Avenue, and 118 Avenue. The need for a free-flow bypass was identified, however interchanges within Spruce Grove were deemed impractical. Highway 16 was redesignated to follow Stony Plain Road, 170 Street, and Yellowhead Trail through Edmonton. By 1988, Highway 16X was twinned and transitioned to being the preferred western entrance into Edmonton, while the Stony Plain Road section of Highway 16 was more focused on commuter traffic. In 1990, in conjunction with Highway 16 assuming the Trans-Canada Highway route shield, Highway 16X also assumed the shield, an exception to the general practice in Alberta where suffixed routes are signed only with a standard Alberta highway shield.
For consistency, the main business and commuter route was renumbered to Highway 16A in 1997 and renamed as the Parkland Highway while the main tourist route became Highway 16.

Future 
Highway 16X is the designation of three proposed bypasses around Hinton, Edson, and Lloydminster. The province of Alberta has determined alignments for all three bypasses, coincidentally all would be on the south side of the present Highway 16 alignments. The Hinton bypass, temporarily designated as 16X:02, would run between Highway 40 south and Drinnan Way, bypassing a  section of Highway 16. The bypass of Edson, designated as 16X:06, would run between 75 Street and the Edson Golf Course, bypassing  of Highway 16. East of Highway 17, the bypass would be under Saskatchewan provincial jurisdiction. , a planning study for the bypass had not been published by Saskatchewan. Funding for the Alberta portion was not included in the 2016-2019 construction plan.

Major intersections

References 

016X
016X
Roads in Edmonton